Rasmus Nellemann (2 March 1923 – 4 September 2004) was a Danish painter and illustrator. He is remembered in particular for his many abstract postage stamp designs.

Biography
Born in Millinge near Fåborg on the island of Funen, Nellemann was introduced to art at the Odense Technical School before attending the Royal Danish Academy of Fine Arts (1948–53) where he studied painting under Aksel Jørgensen and Vilhelm Lundstrøm and graphic arts under Holger Jensen.

In 1950, Nellemann exhibited six paintings of Millinge at the Artists Autumn Exhibition (Kunstnernes Efterårsudstilling) but soon concentrated on graphic arts, initially lithography, then etching. His illustrations were in a simple abstract style, full of straight lines. He also designed many postage stamps from 1960 to 1992, becoming Denmark's most productive artist in the field with 32 different designs.

Nellemannn was also a ceramist, applying his Constructivist approach to ceramic reliefs for the Bygholm agricultural school near Horsens and Ledøje-Smørum's town hall.

Awards
In 1974, Nellemann was awarded the Eckersberg Medal and, in 1986, the Thorvaldsen Medal.

References

Literature

External links
Illustrated list of Rasmus Nellemann's works in Danish museums
Selection of Nellemann's works from Clausens Kunsthandel
Examples of Nellemann's postage stamp designs from the Post & Tele Museum

1923 births
2004 deaths
20th-century Danish painters
20th-century Danish illustrators
20th-century Danish ceramists
Danish stamp designers
People from Faaborg-Midtfyn Municipality
Recipients of the Thorvaldsen Medal
Recipients of the Eckersberg Medal
Royal Danish Academy of Fine Arts alumni
20th-century ceramists